George Reid (1845–1918) was Prime Minister of Australia from 1904–1905.

George Reid may also refer to:

Art
 George Reid (Scottish artist) (1841–1913)
 George Ogilvy Reid (1851–1928), Scottish landscape and portrait artist
 George Agnew Reid (1860–1947), Canadian artist
 George Macdonald Reid (1907–1969), Canadian sculptor

Military
 George Reid (soldier) (1733–1815), American Revolutionary War general
 George Croghan Reid (1876–1961), American Medal of Honor recipient
 George Reid (RAF officer) (1893–1991), World War I flying ace

Politics
 George Alexander Reid (died 1852), British Member of Parliament for Windsor
 George Reid (Victorian politician) (1903–1993), Attorney-General of Victoria
 George Reid (Scottish politician) (born 1939), Presiding Officer of the Scottish Parliament

Other
 G. Archdall Reid or George Archdall Reid (1860–1929), Scottish physician and writer
 Geordie Reid (George T. Reid, 1882–1960), Scottish footballer
 George Reid (footballer) (1896–?), Northern Irish footballer
 George Reid (born 1989), British electronic musician and member of AlunaGeorge
 George Reid (moderator) (1692-1763), moderator of the General Assembly of the Church of Scotland in 1755
 George T. H. Reid, moderator of the General Assembly of the Church of Scotland in 1973

See also 
George Read (disambiguation)
George Reade (1687–1756), soldier
George Reed (disambiguation)